The National Workers' Central (CNT) is a national trade union center in Paraguay. It was formed in 1963 as the Christian Workers' Central (CCT) and changed its name in 1978.

The CNT is affiliated with the International Trade Union Confederation.

References

Trade unions in Paraguay
International Trade Union Confederation
Trade unions established in 1963